Jutland Shinboners is an Australian rules football team in Denmark.

Jutland Shinboners began in 2005 as the Jutland Power.  They are the representative side of the two Jutland clubs (Aalborg and Århus) for matches in the Danish Australian Football League Premier League.

See also

References

Australian rules football clubs in Denmark
2005 establishments in Denmark
Australian rules football clubs established in 2005